Chang Kang-myoung (Korean: 장강명) is a South Korean writer.

Life 
Chang Kang-myoung was born in 1975 in Seoul. He graduated from Yonsei University in urban engineering and worked in a construction company, which he quit. Then he joined the Dong-a Ilbo daily and worked as a reporter for 11 years. He began his career as a writer when he was awarded the Hankyoreh Literary Award for his novel Phyobaek (표백 The bleached) in 2011. He received the Surim Literary Award in 2014 for his novel Yeolgwanggeumji, ebarodeu (열광금지, 에바로드, No enthusiasm, Eva Road); he received the Jeju 4·3 Peace Prize for his novel Daetgeulbudae (댓글부대 The comments army) in 2015; and he received the Munhakdongne Writer Award for Geumeum, ttoneun dangsini segyereul gieokhaneun bangsik (그믐, 또는 당신이 세계를 기억하는 방식 Waning crescent, or the way you remember the world). He has also written novels Homodominanseu (호모도미난스 Homodominance), Hanguki sileoseo (한국이 싫어서 Because I don’t like Korea), and a short story collection Lumière People (뤼미에르 피플). He received the Today’s Writer Award in 2016 for Daetgeulbudae (댓글부대 The comments army).

Works 
 Aseutatin (아스타틴 Astatine), Epiclog, 2017. 
 Uriui sowoneun jeonjaeng (우리의 소원은 전쟁 Our wish is war), Wisdom House, 2016. 
 Daetgeulbudae (댓글부대  The comments army), EunHaengNaMu, 2015. 
 Geumeum, ttoneun dangsini segyereul gieokhaneun bangsik (그믐, 또는 당신이 세계를 기억하는 방식 Waning crescent, or the way you remember the world), Munhakdongne, 2015. 
 Hanguki sileoseo (한국이 싫어서 Because I don’t like Korea), Minumsa, 2015. 
 Homodominanseu (호모도미난스 Homodominance), EunHaengNaMu, 2014
 Yeolgwanggeumji, ebarodeu (열광금지, 에바로드, No enthusiasm, Eva Road), Yeonhap News, 2014. 
 Lumière  People (뤼미에르 피플), Hanibook, 2012. 
 The Bleached (표백), Hanibook, 2011.
 Keullon peurojecteu (클론 프로젝트 The Clone Project), DongA, 1996.

Works in translation 
 Parce que je déteste la Corée (French)
 Fired: K-Fiction Series 13 (English)

Awards 
 2016 Today’s Writer Award
 2015 Jeju 4·3 Peace Prize
 2015 Munhakdongne Writer Award
 2014 Surim Literary Award 
 2011 Hankyoreh Literary Award

Further reading 
 Book excerpt: Waning Crescent, or the Way You Remember the World (English)
 Book excerpt: "Fired," Asia Publishers, 2015 (English)
 Book review: The Animal Inside Them: Lumière People by Chang Kang-myoung (English)
 When Twentysomethings Begin Storytelling: Korean Literature Since the Asian Financial Crisis (English)
 Interview: Chang Kang-myoung : «En Corée, les jeunes sont pétrifiés à l’idée d’échouer» (French)
 Kim, Pil-nam, “Our Fiction’ is War,” Literary Criticism Today, Summer issue, 2017. 
 “Chang Kang-myoung, “I’m like Gong Ji-young… My role model is George Orwell,” Hankook Ilbo, May 4, 2017. 
 “Could I Do It Like Chang Kang-myoung?” ... Hopes for ‘Multi-prizes’ in Literature Prizes", Hankook Ilbo, May 15, 2017. 
 “Chang Kang-myoung “I Don’t Only Ask Uncomfortable Questions. They’re Really Messages That Ask About Life”, Seoul Economic Daily, May 16, 2017. 
 Chang, Kang-myoung, Ji-eun Baek, and Yu-jeong Kang, “Special Discussion 2: Literary Awards, Seeing the Future From Today”, World Literature, Summer 2015, pp. 357–358. 
 Kim, Seul-gi, “Because I’m Curious About Chang Kang-myoung”, World Literature, Fall 2015, pp. 69. 
 Seo, Hui-won, “’Pattern’ and “Sympathy’, or How You Understand ‘Chang Kang-myoung’", Hyundae Munhak, November 2015, pp. 298–299.

References

External links 
 Book Trailer: Waning Crescent, or the Way You Remember the World
 Chang Kang-myoung, Because I Hate Korea, translation by Stephen J. Epstein and Mi Young Kim with an introduction by Stephen J. Epstein, The Asia Pacific Journal. Japan Focus Volume 16, Issue 11, Number 4 (May 21, 2018)

1975 births
Living people
South Korean writers
South Korean male writers
People from Seoul